Claudio Cabán (born August 25, 1963) is a retired Puerto Rican marathon runner. He competed for his native country in the men's marathon at the 1984 Summer Olympics, finishing in 53rd place. He set his personal best in the classic distance (2:20.45) in 1983.

Achievements

References
 sports-reference

1963 births
Living people
Puerto Rican male marathon runners
Puerto Rican male long-distance runners
Olympic track and field athletes of Puerto Rico
Athletes (track and field) at the 1984 Summer Olympics